The Far North Coast District Rugby Union, or FNCRU, is the governing body for the sport of rugby union within the District of  Far North Coast in Australia. It is a member of the New South Wales Country Rugby Union.

Clubs

First Grade Clubs 

  Ballina Rugby Union Club
  Bangalow
  Byron Bay
  Casino
  Casurina Beach
  Lennox Head
  Lismore
  Wollongbar/Alstonville

Lower Grades/Defunct Clubs 

  Evans River
  Iluka Cossacks
  Kyogle Cockies
  Mullumbimby
  Murwillumbah Gentlemen
  Richmond Range
  Woolgoolga Whitepointers
  Yamba Buccaneers

Venues

These are the venues for the FNCRU

Ballina- Quays Reserve, Ballina

Bangalow- Schultz Oval, Bangalow

Byron Bay- Memorial Recreational Field, Byron Bay

Casuarina Beach- Casuarina Beach Rugby Fields, Casuarina

Casino- Albert Park, Casino

Evans River- Stan Payne Oval, Evans Head

Grafton- Hay Street Rugby Fields, Grafton

Iluka- Ken Leeson Oval, Ilulka

Kyogle- Don Gulley Oval, Kyogle

Lennox  Head- Williams Reserve, Lennox Head

Lismore City- Lismore City Rugby Grounds, Lismore

Mullumbimby- Alby Lofts Oval, Brunswick Heads / Schultz Oval, Bangalow

Southern Cross University- Maurie Ryan Oval, East Lismore

Wollongbar-Alstonville- Lyle Park, Wollongbar

Yamba- Kane Douglas Field / Coldstream Oval, Yamba

Tenterfield- Federation Reserve, Tenterfield

Clubs
The club's that compete in the senior grade competition are:
Ballina Seahorses
Bangalow Rebels	 
Byron Bay Sandcrabs
Casuarina Beach Barbarians
Casino Bulls	 
Evans River Killer Whales 	 
Grafton Redmen	 
Iluka Cossacks
Kyogle Cockies	 
Lennox Head Trojans	 
Lismore City	 
Mullumbimby Moonshiners 	 
Southern Cross University Gold Rats
Wollongbar/Alstonville Pioneers 
Yamba Buccaneers
Tenterfield Bumblebees
Grades

Coopers FNCRU 1st Grade

Coopers FNCRU Reserve Grade

Coopers FNCRU Presidents Cup

Coopers FNCRU Women's 10s

McDonald FNCJRU Under 9s

McDonald FNCJRU Under 10s

McDonald FNCJRU Under 11s

McDonald FNCJRU Under 12s

McDonald FNCJRU Under 13s

McDonald FNCJRU Under 14s

McDonald FNCJRU Under 15s

McDonald FNCJRU Under 16s

McDonald FNCJRU Under 17s

Coopers sponsor the FNCRU & Men's & Women's

McDonalds sponsor the FNCJRU Junior Rugby

See also

Rugby union in New South Wales
List of Australian club rugby union competitions

References

External links
 
 

Rugby union governing bodies in New South Wales
Northern Rivers